Oakland Cemetery (also known as Confederate Cemetery) is a historic cemetery in Camden, Arkansas, located on Maul Road between Pearl Street and Madison Avenue. Established in 1830, it is the city's oldest cemetery. It is the burial site of many of Camden's leading citizens. Among them is James Thomas Elliott (1823–1875), a former Confederate soldier who represented Arkansas's 2nd District as a Republican.

An area of just under one acre which is separated from the rest of the cemetery by a chain fence is reserved for Camden's Confederate States Army fallen, and features a granite obelisk topped by a cannonball.  There are 231 graves in this section, including both known and unknown individuals.

The entire cemetery was listed on the National Register of Historic Places in 2000.  The Confederate section of the cemetery was separately listed on the National Register in 1996.

See also
 National Register of Historic Places listings in Ouachita County, Arkansas

References

External links
 
 

Cemeteries on the National Register of Historic Places in Arkansas
Buildings and structures completed in 1830
Buildings and structures in Camden, Arkansas
1830 establishments in Arkansas Territory
Protected areas of Ouachita County, Arkansas
National Register of Historic Places in Ouachita County, Arkansas
Cemeteries established in the 1830s